Asiedu Yirenkyi (8 December 1942 – 10 May 2018) was a Ghanaian playwright, actor, director, theatre company manager  and author of screen plays. He was born Emmanuel  Asiedu Yirenchi at Akropong-Akuapem in the Eastern Region of Ghana to Charles Okata Yirenkyi, a farmer and Comfort Yaa Nyarkoa, a homemaker. He was the younger brother of the late Ghanaian actor and film maker Rev. Kofi Yirenkyi.

Yirenkyi's name has been associated with pioneering roles in Drama and the National Theatre movement from the early days of Ghana's independence. He was  a member of Ghana's first experimental theatre group in the late 1950s. In the early 1960s joined Efua Sutherland's Drama Studio players as a boy actor and was among the group of studio players who performed on the night Dr. Kwame Nkrumah formally opened the Drama Studio in 1960. His formal education in Theatre began with a Diploma in Drama from the University of Ghana, Legon. In 1968, when Yirenkyi gained admission into the Yale School of Drama he made history by becoming the first Ghanaian to receive a grant to study drama in the USA. He graduated in 1971 with the prestigious John Golden Scholar Award in Playwriting. At Yale his mates included African American Theatre icon Walter Dallas and Henry Winkler. He lectured at the University of Ghana, Legon and at the Ahmadu Bello University in Zaria, Nigeria.

Like writer Ama Ata Aidoo, also involved in the Ghana Drama Studio, Yirenkyi later served as a minister in the Provisional National Defence Council of Jerry Rawlings: he was Secretary for Culture and Tourism from 1982 to 1984, when he resigned. It was under his political leadership in 1983 that the first elaborate work on Ghana's Cultural Policy was carried out.

He died on 10 May 2018.

Works
 Kivuli and other plays, 1980
 Dasebre: a play on African rituals and games, 1990
 Two Plays: Dasebre and The Red Ants, 2003

References

1942 births
2018 deaths
Ghanaian writers
Ghanaian dramatists and playwrights